Ewa Zagata (born 17 May 1970) is a Polish alpine skier. She competed in two events at the 1992 Winter Olympics.

References

1970 births
Living people
Polish female alpine skiers
Olympic alpine skiers of Poland
Alpine skiers at the 1992 Winter Olympics
Sportspeople from Zakopane
20th-century Polish women